Hypostomus wilsoni is a species of catfish in the family Loricariidae. It is native to South America, where it occurs in the basin of the Truando River, which is part of the Atrato River drainage in Colombia. The species reaches 32.5 cm (12.8 inches) in total length and is believed to be a facultative air-breather.

References 

wilsoni
Freshwater fish of Colombia
Fish described in 1918